Stagecoach Dam is a gravity dam on the Yampa River in Routt County, Colorado, located about  south of Steamboat Springs. The dam serves for irrigation, municipal water supply, and flood control, and it also supports a hydroelectric power station with a capacity of 800 kilowatts.

First proposed in 1983, the dam was completed on August 12, 1989, after just 37 days of construction. The dam and reservoir are owned and operated by the Upper Yampa Water Conservancy District.

See also
Stagecoach State Park

References

Buildings and structures in Routt County, Colorado
Dams in Colorado
Gravity dams
United States local public utility dams
Dams completed in 1989
Dams in the Green River (Colorado River tributary) basin
Roller-compacted concrete dams
1989 establishments in Colorado